"I Can Change" is a song by American rock band LCD Soundsystem. The song was released as the third official single from the band's third studio album This Is Happening, on May 29, 2009. It was written by band member Pat Mahoney and band frontman James Murphy and was produced by the DFA. The song was featured on the soundtrack for the video game FIFA 11 and peaked at number 85 on the French Singles Chart.

Track listing

12" vinyl
 DFA 22591

CD
 DFA 2259X

Digital download

Charts

References

2010 singles
2010 songs
LCD Soundsystem songs
American new wave songs
Songs written by James Murphy (electronic musician)